The Novator KS-172 was a Russian air-to-air missile project designed as an "AWACS killer" at ranges up to 400 km. The missile had various names during its history, including K-100,  Izdeliye 172 ('project 172'), AAM-L (RVV-L), KS–172, KS-1, 172S-1 and R-172. The airframe appears to have been derived from the 9K37 Buk surface-to-air missile (SAM) but development stalled in the mid-1990s for lack of funds. It appears to have restarted in 2004 after a deal with India, who wants to produce the missile in India for their Su-30MKI fighters. Nowadays the development is stopped and the project is closed.

Development
Modern airforces have become dependent on airborne radars typically carried by converted airliners and transport aircraft such as the E-3 Sentry and A-50 'Mainstay'. They also depend on similar aircraft for inflight refuelling (e.g. Vickers VC10), maritime patrol (e.g. CP-140 Aurora), reconnaissance and electronic warfare (e.g. Tu-16 'Badger' E & J) and C4ISTAR (e.g. VC-25 "Air Force One"). The loss of just one of these aircraft can have a significant effect on fighting capability, and they are usually heavily defended by fighter escorts. A long-range air-to-air missile offers the prospect of bringing down the target without having to fight a way through the fighter screen. Given the potential importance of "blinding" Western AWACS, Russia has devoted considerable resources to this area.

NPO Novator started work in 1991 on a very long-range air-to-air missile with the Russian project designation Izdeliye 172. Initially called the AAM-L (RVV-L), it made its first public appearance at the International Defence Exhibition in Abu Dhabi in early 1993, followed by the Moscow Air Show later that year. Apparently some flight-testing was done on a Su-27, but it appears that the Russians withdrew funding for the project soon afterwards.

The missile resurfaced as the KS–172 in 1999, as part of a new export-led strategy whereby foreign investment in a -range export model would ultimately fund a version for the Russian airforce. Again it appears that there were no takers.

In late 2003, the missile was offered again on the export market as the 172S-1. In March 2004, India was reported to have invested in the project and to be "negotiating a partnership" to develop the "R-172". In May 2005 the Indians were said to have finalised "an arrangement to fund final development and licence produce the weapon" in a joint venture similar to that which produced the successful BrahMos cruise missile. Since then the missile has had a higher profile, appearing at the 2005 Moscow Air Show on a Su-30 as the K-172, and a modified version being shown at the 2007 Moscow Air Show designated as the K-100-1. This name first appeared in a Sukhoi document in 2006, and sources such as Jane's now refer to the missile as the K-100. Nowadays the missile is not in commission whether in Russia nor in India. Supposedly the development was stopped and the project closed by 2010.

Design

The mockup shown in 1993 had a strong resemblance to the Buk airframe, but since the Indians became involved there have been some changes. An Indian magazine gave the specifications of the KS–172 in April 2004 as a core 6.01 m long and 40 cm in diameter with a wingspan of 61 cm, with a booster of 1.4 m, and 748 kg total weight. Development would concentrate on the seeker head, autopilot, resistance to jamming and a steering system with 3D thrust vector control (TVC).

In May 2005 it was reported that there were two versions, with and without a rocket booster, with ranges of 400 km and 300 km respectively. At the MAKS (air show) in August 2005, a range of 300 km was quoted for a streamlined missile with a small booster and fins on both booster and fuselage. However the model shown at the 2007 MAKS airshow under the name K-100 was closer to the original 1993 mockup in the photo above, with different-shaped fins that were further up the fuselage, and an even larger booster with TVC vents. At the same show it was shown under the wing of a Su-35BM, implying that at least two could be carried by Flanker-class aircraft rather than just one on the centreline.

Guidance is by inertial navigation until the missile is close enough to the target to use active radar for terminal homing. The K-100 has an enlarged derivative of the Agat 9B-1103M seeker used in the R-27 (air-to-air missile) (AA-10 'Alamo').

Variant
KS-172

Prototype in 1993.
KS-172S-1

Prototype in 2003.

Similar weapons
 R-37 (missile) (AA-X-13/AA-13 'Arrow') was developed from the R-33 (missile) (AA-9 'Amos') and is intended for the Sukhoi Su-35 Flanker-E, Sukhoi Su-37 Flanker-F, MiG 1.42 MFI and other future fighters. Jane's reports two variants, the R-37 and the R-37M; the latter has a jettisonable rocket booster that increases the range to "300-400km" (160–220nmi). Work on the missile appears to have restarted in late 2006, as part of the MiG-31BM programme to update the Foxhound with a new radar and ground attack capability.
 Kh-31 (AS-17 'Krypton') –  the Chinese have licensed the anti-radar version (Kh-31P) of this Russian air-to-surface missile, and may be working on an "AWACS killer" variant of their YJ-91 derivative. The Russians claim the anti-shipping version, the Kh-31A, can be adapted for use as an AWACS killer.
 AIM-54 Phoenix – Now retired, a -range missile that was carried by the US Navy's F-14 Tomcat.
 AIM-97 Seekbat - based on the Standard Missile SAM, the Seekbat was an extremely long-ranged missile designed to shoot down the MiG-25 Foxbat, which at the time had almost mythical performance estimates. When the real-world performance of the Foxbat was found to be dramatically less impressive, development was cancelled.

See also 

 AIM-152 AAAM
 FMRAAM
 Meteor (missile)
 R-37 (missile)
 PL-21

References

External links
sukhoi.ru – unofficial site with photos from MAKS air show; photos 10,12 and 13 show the K-100 on the ground of which maks2007d1013.jpg is perhaps the best.

Weapons of Russia
Air-to-air missiles of India
Air-to-air missiles of Russia
NPO Novator products
Military equipment introduced in the 2000s